Waddington Bay is an Antarctic bay  long, in a NW-SE direction, and  wide, indenting the west coast of Kyiv Peninsula, Graham Land, immediately north of Cape Tuxen. This bay is partially defined on the charts of the Belgian Antarctic Expedition, 1897–99, under Gerlache. It was more fully delineated by the French Antarctic Expedition, 1908–10, under Charcot, who named it for Senator Waddington, president of the Chamber of Commerce at Rouen.

A gentoo penguin colony was discovered at the southern headland of Waddington Bay in January 2014 by a group of kayakers.

See also
Waddington Bay (British Columbia)
Waddington (disambiguation)

Gallery

External links
 SCAR Composite Gazetteer of Antarctica.

Bays of Graham Land
Graham Coast